American country music singer Morgan Wallen has released three studio albums, three extended plays, twelve singles, and 13 music videos.

Studio albums

Extended plays

Singles

As lead artist

As featured artist

Promotional singles

Other charted or certified songs

Music videos

Notes

References 

Discographies of American artists
Country music discographies